ZT2 may refer to:
 Zoo Tycoon 2
 Zoo Tycoon 2: Endangered Species
 Zoo Tycoon 2: African Adventure
 Zoo Tycoon 2: Marine Mania
 Zoo Tycoon 2: Extinct Animals